Hexalectris arizonica, the spiked crested coralroot or Arizona crested coralroot, is a terrestrial, myco-heterotrophic orchid lacking chlorophyll and subsisting entirely on nutrients obtained from mycorrhizal fungi in the soil. It is native to Arizona, New Mexico, Texas and Coahuila. It is closely related to H. spicata and sometimes regarded as a variety of that species.

References

External links
US Department of Agriculture plants profile, Hexalectris arizonica 
New Mexico Rare Plants, University of New Mexico, Hexalectris arizonica, (Arizona crested coralroot) 

Bletiinae
Orchids of North America
Myco-heterotrophic orchids
Flora of Arizona
Flora of New Mexico
Flora of Coahuila
Flora of Texas
Plants described in 1882